NGC 4261 is an elliptical galaxy located around 100 million light-years away in the constellation Virgo. It was discovered April 13, 1784 by the German-born astronomer William Herschel. The galaxy is a member of its own somewhat meager galaxy group known as the NGC 4261 group, which is part of the Virgo Cluster.

The morphological classification of this galaxy is E2, indicating an elliptical galaxy with a 5:4 ratio between the major and minor axes. The stellar population of the galaxy is old, showing no indications of recent mergers or interactions with other members of its group. Large-scale isophotes of the galaxy are generally boxy in form, with no markers that would suggest a disruptive interaction within the last billion years. There is a dust lane along the north–south axis of the galaxy and a disk of dust around the nucleus.

Two prominent jets emanating from the nucleus can be observed in the radio band. The galaxy is estimated to be about 60 thousand light-years across, and a jet emanating from it is estimated to span about 88 thousand light-years.

A Type Ia supernova event in this galaxy was reported on January 1, 2001. It was designated SN 2001A, marking the first supernova discovery of the year. It reached magnitude 18.4 on December 15th of the previous year.

Gallery

References

External links

 Animation of the black hole in the center of NGC 4261

Elliptical galaxies
Supermassive black holes
Radio galaxies
Virgo Cluster
Virgo (constellation)
4261
07360
39659